The Cape Neddick River is a  river in the town of York in southern Maine. It rises at the outlet of Chases Pond and flows east to the Atlantic Ocean, reaching its mouth at Cape Neddick Harbor near the village of Cape Neddick.

See also
List of rivers of Maine

References

Maine Streamflow Data from the USGS
Maine Watershed Data From Environmental Protection Agency

Rivers of Maine
Rivers of York County, Maine